Uvariodendron usambarense is a species of plant in the family Annonaceae. It is endemic to Tanzania.

References

Flora of Tanzania
usambarense
Vulnerable plants
Taxonomy articles created by Polbot